First stage or First Stage may refer to:
 First Stage Children's Theater, a professional American children's theater based in Milwaukee, Wisconsin 
 First stage (rocketry), the first stage of a multistage rocket
 the first reading of a bill in the parliament of Ireland
 the high pressure regulator of a diving regulator